The 2017 SEC softball tournament was held at Sherri Parker Lee Stadium on the campus of University of Tennessee in Knoxville, Tennessee, from May 10 through May 13, 2017. The tournament will earn the Southeastern Conference's automatic bid to the 2017 NCAA Division I softball tournament. The Championship game was broadcast on ESPN and the semifinals were broadcast on ESPNU, while all other SEC tournament games will be live on the SEC Network.

Tournament

 Only the top 12 teams are able to participate, therefore, Georgia was not eligible to play.
 Vanderbilt does not sponsor a softball team.

Schedule

Due to rain the semifinals were delayed to May 13 and moved from ESPNU to SEC Network and ESPN2.

See also
 2017 Alabama Crimson Tide softball team
 2017 Auburn Tigers softball team

References

SEC softball tournament
tournament